Carl "Dutchie" Schell (2 December 1924 – 28 February 2020) was a Canadian judoka who played a significant role in the development of judo in Canada, especially New Brunswick. Schell established the first judo club in New Brunswick at the Saint John YMCA in 1958, then co-founded the Shimpokai Judo Club with Harry Thomas, John Crawford, Doug Kearns, and Ken Meeting in Saint John in 1959. He also founded the New Brunswick Kodokan Black Belt Association in 1961, served as its President and in other executive roles, served as Atlantic vice-president of Judo Canada, and coached the New Brunswick judo team. Schell was inducted into the Saint John Sports Hall of Fame in 2000, the Judo Canada Hall of Fame in 2003, and the New Brunswick Sports Hall of Fame in 2007.

Publications

See also 

 Judo in New Brunswick
Judo in Canada
 List of Canadian judoka

References 

1924 births
2020 deaths
Canadian male judoka
Sportspeople from Saint John, New Brunswick
20th-century Canadian people
21st-century Canadian people